This is a list of mosques in Tunisia. According to the data by the Ministry of Religious Affairs in December 2015, there are 5,470 mosques in Tunisia as a whole, among which 4,299 are Jami Masjids which conduct Friday Prayer and 1,171 are smaller mosques. The city of Sfax has highest number of mosques, with 418 Jama Masjids and 88 smaller mosques. The city of Djerba contains 380 mosques, among which 20 are underground mosques.

See also
Islam in Tunisia
List of mosques in Tunis

References 

Tunisia
 
Mosques